Burg Hollenburg is a medieval castle near Köttmannsdorf in Carinthia, Austria. It is on a rock of the northern slope of the Drava valley.

One Swiker, Lord of Hollenburg in the Duchy of Carinthia was first documented as a witness in the 1142 deed of the foundation of Viktring Abbey. He may have been a vassal of the ducal House of Sponheim; his son Reginher is mentioned as Lord of Steuerberg, he accompanied King Conrad III of Germany on the Second Crusade in 1147 and later appeared as a ministerialis of Margrave Ottokar IV of Styria. 

The castle was of strategical importance due to its location at a Drava river crossing and the road to the Loibl Pass and the March of Carniola. Upon the extinction of the Hollenburg dynasty in 1246, it passed to the Styrian Lords of Pettau, in 1438 it was inherited by the House of Stubenberg. The structure had been severely damaged by the 1348 Friuli earthquake.

In 1514 the Habsburg emperor Maximilian I, stuck in the War of the League of Cambrai against Venice and highly indebted, sold Hollenburg to Lord Siegmund of Dietrichstein, elevating him to the rank of a Freiherr (Baron). The House of Dietrichstein had the castle rebuilt in a Renaissance style, finished in 1588. The Dietrichsteins held the castle until the extinction of the branch in 1861, it was acquired by the Wittgenstein family in 1913.

See also
List of castles in Austria

References

This article was initially translated from the German Wikipedia.

Hollenburg